Abdul Rahman Jassim is a Bahraini modern pentathlete. He competed at the 1984 Summer Olympics, finishing in 40th place in the individual event.

References

External links
 

Year of birth missing (living people)
Living people
Bahraini male modern pentathletes
Olympic modern pentathletes of Bahrain
Modern pentathletes at the 1984 Summer Olympics